Prosa UML Modeller assists software developers to design applications visually by using Unified Modeling Language. 
Unified Modeling Language - UML 

, is a standardized graphic notation developed to create visual models of object oriented software systems.

Prosa automates diagram creation and checking, and produces C++, C#, Java code headers and SQL DDL for implementation.
Concurrent documentation ensures accurate documents which are consistent with the software design.

Prosa has integrations with programmer's workbenches, version control software, documentation tools and
web pages.

Several designers can work concurrently in the same modeling project. The diagrams are locked so that only one designer is allowed to edit a diagram at a time. Standard security settings of the file system can be used to set designer specific read/write 
rights.

Prosa UML tool has achieved an established and notable position in analysis and design tool business. 

Prosa is available for Microsoft Windows.

Versions
Prosa UML Modeller V5.24 for Windows, October 2013

File Format
Prosa UML  Modeller stores diagrams in ASCII text format.

See also
List of Unified Modeling Language tools

References

External links

UML tools
Programming tools for Windows